Thomas Christmas  was an Irish politician.

Christmas was born in Waterford, son of Richard  Christmas, High Sheriff of Waterford in 1686, and Susanna  Aland, daughter of  Henry Aland, and was educated at Trinity College, Dublin. He was MP for the Irish constituency of Waterford City from 1713 to 1747. Like his father and his grandfather, the elder Thomas Christmas, he was High Sheriff of Waterford (1715). The Christmas family were dominant in Waterford politics from the late seventeenth century up to the 1860s.

He married Elizabeth Marshall, daughter of John Marshall of Clonmel (died 1717), and sister of Robert Marshall, judge of the Court of Common Pleas (Ireland); Robert is best remembered as the executor and co-legatee of Esther Vanhomrigh, the beloved "Vanessa" of Jonathan Swift. Thomas and Elizabeth had four children, including Thomas junior and William, who both followed their father into Parliament, and Elizabeth, who married Sir William Osborne, 8th Baronet. Their daughter Ada married her cousin Thomas Christmas and had issue including William Christmas. Thomas junior married Lady Catherine Beresford, daughter of Marcus Beresford, 1st Earl of Tyrone. After his early death, Catherine remarried Theophilus Jones and had three sons.

References

Alumni of Trinity College Dublin
Irish MPs 1713–1714
Irish MPs 1715–1727
Irish MPs 1727–1760
Members of the Parliament of Ireland (pre-1801) for County Waterford constituencies
People from Waterford (city)